Vanguardia may refer to:

Newspapers
Vanguardia (newspaper), a Cuban newspaper
La Vanguardia, Catalonia's leading daily newspaper
Vanguardia Liberal (previously known as La Vanguardia Liberal), a Colombian regional newspaper
Vanguardia (Málaga), newspaper of the Communist Party of Spain
Vanguardia MX, A.K.A. Periódico Vanguardia – Saltillo, Coahuila, A Mexican newspaper
La Vanguardia (Argentina), an Argentine newspaper

Other uses
La Vanguardia Airport an airport in Colombia
Cerro Vanguardia Mine a gold and silver mine in Argentina
Vanguardia de la Ciencia was a Spanish science podcast and radio program
Vanguardia, a type of Cuban art

See also
Vanguardism, a revolutionary strategy, or a cooperation of avant-garde artists
Avant-garde